Richard H. Willis is an American economist, currently the Anne Marie and Thomas B. Walker, Jr. Professor of Accounting at Owen Graduate School of Management, Vanderbilt University.

References

Year of birth missing (living people)
Living people
Vanderbilt University faculty
American economists